Rosmalen is a railway station located in the town of Rosmalen. It is one of three railway stations in the municipality of 's-Hertogenbosch, Netherlands.
The railway station was opened at the Tilburg–Nijmegen railway in 1881. It was closed again in 1938. In 1981 the railway station was reopened again, but this time on another location.

Train services

The following services currently call at Rosmalen:
2x per hour local services (stoptrein) Nijmegen - Oss - 's-Hertogenbosch

External links
NS website 
Dutch Public Transport journey planner

References 

Railway stations in 's-Hertogenbosch
Railway stations opened in 1881
1881 establishments in the Netherlands
Railway stations in the Netherlands opened in the 19th century